Stella Boumi (born March 31, 1988) is a Greek former swimmer, who specialized in backstroke events. She represented her nation Greece at the 2008 Summer Olympics, and also swam for Olympiacos in Athens.

Boumi competed as part of the Greek swimming squad in the women's 200 m backstroke at the 2008 Summer Olympics in Beijing. Three months before the Games, she cleared a FINA B-standard in 2:14.03 to earn a place on the Olympic team at the Akropolis Grand Prix in Athens. Boumi posted a 2:14.73 to finish heat two in fifth place and twenty-ninth overall on the evening prelims, failing to advance to the semifinals.

References

External links
NBC 2008 Olympics profile

1988 births
Living people
Greek female swimmers
Olympic swimmers of Greece
Swimmers at the 2008 Summer Olympics
Female backstroke swimmers
Swimmers from Athens